USS Muscatine is a name borne by two vessels of the U.S. Navy:

 , a refrigerator ship built in 1917
 , a cargo ship launched 16 June 1944

References 

United States Navy ship names